During the 1998–99 Dutch football season, PSV Eindhoven competed in the Eredivisie.

Season summary
PSV dropped one place in the final league table to third, only qualifying for the Champions League on the final day of the season. Manager Bobby Robson's contract expired at the end of the season, and former PSV right-back Eric Gerets was signed from Belgian champions Club Brugge as his replacement.

Players

First-team squad
Squad at end of season

Left club during season

Jong PSV

Transfers

In
 Jürgen Dirkx - Fortuna Sittard
 Joonas Kolkka - Willem II
 Patrick Lodewijks - Groningen
 Theo Lucius - Den Bosch
 Giorgi Gakhokidze - Alania Vladikavkaz
 Marcos - Rio Ave
 Jorginho Paulista - Palmeiras

Out
 Wilfred Bouma - Fortuna Sittard, loan
 Jorginho Paulista - Udinese, January, loan

References

Notes

PSV Eindhoven seasons
PSV Eindhoven